Tosa d'Alp or La Tosa is a  mountain in Baixa Cerdanya in the Spanish Pyrenees. 
The Coll de Pal is a mountain pass that separates its eastern part from the Puigllançada. This mountain forms a quadripoint where the Alp, Urús, Das and Bagà municipal limits meet.
There is a triangulation station (282081001) at the summit.

Part of its slopes are home to the ski resort of Masella which is part of Alp 2500.

References 

Mountains of Catalonia